In mathematics, particularly, in asymptotic convex geometry, Milman's reverse Brunn–Minkowski inequality is a result due to Vitali Milman that provides a reverse inequality to the famous Brunn–Minkowski inequality for convex bodies in n-dimensional Euclidean space Rn. Namely, it bounds the volume of the Minkowski sum of two bodies from above in terms of the volumes of the bodies.

Introduction

Let K and L be convex bodies in Rn. The Brunn–Minkowski inequality states that

where vol denotes n-dimensional Lebesgue measure and the + on the left-hand side denotes Minkowski addition.

In general, no reverse bound is possible, since one can find convex bodies K and L of unit volume so that the volume of their Minkowski sum is arbitrarily large. Milman's theorem states that one can replace one of the bodies by its image under a properly chosen volume-preserving linear map so that the left-hand side of the Brunn–Minkowski inequality is bounded by a constant multiple of the right-hand side.

The result is one of the main structural theorems in the local theory of Banach spaces.

Statement of the inequality

There is a constant C, independent of n, such that for any two centrally symmetric convex bodies K and L in Rn, there are volume-preserving linear maps φ and ψ from Rn to itself such that for any real numbers s, t > 0

One of the maps may be chosen to be the identity.

Notes

References

 

 

Asymptotic geometric analysis
Euclidean geometry
Geometric inequalities
Theorems in measure theory